Mahdi al-Arabi, is a Libyan brigadier-general who served under the Libyan Armed Forces loyal to Muammar Gaddafi. He was the deputy chief of staff of the Libyan army. During the 2011 Libyan civil war he was put in charge of helping to suppress protests, most notably in the Libyan city of Zawiya.

On 21 August, anti-Gaddafi forces reportedly arrested Arabi in Zawiya. A video purportedly of Arabi in detention was posted to YouTube on 11 September.

References

Year of birth missing (living people)
Living people
Libyan generals
People of the First Libyan Civil War
Libyan prisoners and detainees
Prisoners and detainees of Libya